Maiestas elangatoocellatus (formerly Recilia elangatoocellatus) is a species of leafhopper from the Cicadellidae family that is endemic to Sri Lanka.

The species was moved from Recilia to Maiestas in 2009.

References

Endemic fauna of Sri Lanka
Hemiptera of Asia
Maiestas